Annai Kaligambal is an Indian 2003 bilingual devotional film written and directed by Rama Narayanan. The film featured Ramya Krishnan in the title role alongside Anu Prabhakar and Livingston, while Jayanthi plays a supporting role. The film, which had music composed by Deva, released in January 2003. The film was simultaneously shot in Tamil and Kannada, with the latter titled as Shri Kalikamba, with Vinod Alva and Tennis Krishna replacing Livingston and Vennira Aadai Moorthy respectively. Kannada version was dubbed in Hindi as Maa Durga Divya Haathi and in Telugu as Allari Gajendrudu.

Cast

Soundtrack
Lyrics were written by Kalidasan.
 "Omthana Namthana" - Anuradha Sriram
 "Sangu Pushpame" - Swarnalatha
 "Pachai Pachai" - Devi, Swarnalatha
 "Gane Gane" - Manikka Vinayagam
 "Rama Jayam" - Chorus
 "Amman Dance" - Instrumental

References

2003 films
2000s Tamil-language films
Hindu devotional films
2000s Kannada-language films
Films directed by Rama Narayanan
Indian multilingual films
Films scored by Deva (composer)
2003 multilingual films

External links